Cheshmeh Jamileh (also Romanized as Cheshmeh Jāmīleh and Cheshmeh Jamīleh) is a village in Teshkan Rural District, Chegeni District, Dowreh County, Lorestan Province, Iran. At the 2006 census, its population was 83, in 17 families.

References 

Towns and villages in Dowreh County